Natan Węgrzycki-Szymczyk ˈnatan vɛŋˈɡʒɨt͡ski ˈʃɨmʈ͡ʂɨk (born 5 January 1995) is a Polish competitive rower.

He competed at the 2016 Summer Olympics in Rio de Janeiro, in the men's single sculls.

He was in the stroke seat of the winning Cambridge Light Blue boat in the 2019 Boat Race.

References

External links

1995 births
Living people
Polish male rowers
Olympic rowers of Poland
Rowers at the 2016 Summer Olympics
Sportspeople from Kraków